State Highway 3 (SH 3) is one of New Zealand's eight national state highways. It serves the west coast of the country's North Island and forms a link between State Highway 1 and State Highway 2. Distances are measured from north to south.

For most of its length SH 3 is a two-lane single carriageway, with at-grade intersections and property accesses, both in rural and urban areas.

History 
A Mokau – Awakino horse track was widened to a dray track about 1897. It was then possible for a horse and buggy to cover the  – now 162 km – from New Plymouth to Te Kuiti in 17½ hours. The first car to traverse the route from Auckland to New Plymouth seems to have been an 8 hp Cadillac in 1905, though Ōtorohanga to Te Kuiti was by train and, between Awakino and Mokau, a horse assisted on the beach.

A 1910 Te Kuiti meeting called for metalling of the road to Awakino. Mount Messenger Tunnel opened in 1916 and its single lane was enlarged about 1983. £3,000 (2016 equivalent $280,000) was provided in 1919 for the Awakino Gorge section, including the tunnel (enlarged in 2011), and it was opened in March 1923 at a total cost of about £60,000 (2016 equivalent $5.8m). Most of the route was gazetted as a government main highway in 1924, some sections were tar-sealed in 1925 and more work had been done on the road by 1936, leaving only a few mud sections. By 1949 the road was sealed as far south as Te Kuiti and the reinforced concrete bridge over the Waipā at Ōtorohanga had been started.

The cost was £35,000 (2016 equivalent $3.3m). In 2001 the 1927 bridge was replaced by the current 9-span, double lane, pre-stressed concrete bridge for $6.2m (2016 equivalent $8.5m). The new bridge doesn't allow for shipping, as the first ship to pass under the old lifting span was withdrawn three months after the bridge opened.

An 1871 account of a coach journey from New Plymouth to Wellington described the very poor road round the coast via Ōpunake to Whanganui and the much better and well used road south from there. A government subsidy of £3,000 (2016 equivalent $400,000) a year was being paid for the coach north of Whanganui.

Route

The highway leaves SH 1C at Hamilton, and initially heads south through farmland, passing through Te Awamutu. Sections of this stretch of the road are four-laned, but not divided carriageway. From Ōtorohanga it follows the valley of the Waipā River to Te Kuiti. The road then turns southwest through sparsely settled farmland, crossing several ridges before following the Awakino gorge to reach the coast, which it follows around the North Taranaki Bight. At the Tongaporutu River the highway turns inland to avoid coastal cliffs and climbs over Mount Messenger before descending via the Mimi River valley to return to the coast near Urenui. Bypassing Waitara, it reaches New Plymouth then turns inland, passing to the east of Mount Taranaki via Inglewood, Stratford and Eltham to Hawera.

From Hawera the highway follows the coast of the South Taranaki Bight southeastwards to Patea and Whanganui before meeting SH 1 again at Bulls. SH 1 and 3 share their route for 6 km as they cross the Rangitikei River to Sanson, where SH 3 continues southeast towards Palmerston North. After crossing the Manawatu River, the route follows its south bank through the Manawatu Gorge to its terminus and junction with SH 2 at Woodville in the Tararua District

Both the Awakino and Manawatu gorges are prone to closure by slips and rockslides in heavy rain.

Route changes
Construction of a bypass of Bell Block, a satellite town of New Plymouth, was completed in 2010. The bypass is a four-lane, divided expressway with an interchange at Henwood Road providing access to Bell Block.

In 2016, a section of SH 3 in Taranaki was realigned replacing the "deadly" Normanby overbridge.

Future improvements
State Highway 3 will form part of the future/proposed Southern Links motorway project in the South/West of Hamilton and Tamahere.

In January 2016, funding was announced for road bypasses of the two tunnels north of New Plymouth. Construction of the Mount Messenger and Awakino Gorge tunnel bypasses was expected to begin within two years. On 24 August 2020 Te Korowai Tiahi o Te Hauauru, whose rohe the road crosses, withdrew support from the bypass roading project while in High Court. The Poutama Charitable Trust and New Plymouth locals protested against the project while court was in session, with the argument that this new route would destroy the valley's ecosystem. However, the Transport Agency responded by saying that the bypass is the least ecologically destructive and will deliver road safety.

The highway through the Manawatu Gorge between Ashhurst and Woodville in the Manawatū-Whanganui region was closed in April 2017 due to a large slip, with SH 3 traffic diverted via Saddle Road. Contractors were pulled out of clearing the slip in July 2017 due to ongoing geological movement in the hill, closing the road indefinitely. The NZTA began fast-tracking a long-term solution to bypass and replace the gorge. In March 2018, the NZTA announced a bypass would be built to the north of the gorge, but south of the Saddle Road. Known as Te Ahu a Turanga/Manawatū Tararua Highway, construction of the $620 million road began in January 2021 and is expected be completed in late 2024.

Spur sections

SH 3 has one spur, designated State Highway 3A. This 15.6 km stretch links State Highway 3 just west of Waitara to Inglewood, providing a shortcut and bypass of New Plymouth. The entire length of highway carries the name Mountain Road with the sole exception being a very short link of Rimu Street in Inglewood to rejoin SH 3.

Major junctions

See also
 List of New Zealand state highways
 List of roads and highways, for notable or famous roads worldwide
 Public transport in Hamilton and Waikato

References

External links 
New Zealand Transport Agency
1923 photo of steam roller completing Awakino tunnel
1924 photo of Awakino tunnel

3